Carlos Suárez (1946 – 19 October 2019) was a Spanish cinematographer who worked in various movies like Oviedo Express, Dagon, El Portero, Don Juan en los infiernos and El detective y la muerte.

He was the younger brother of film director Gonzalo Suarez, with whom he collaborated several times. He occasionally acted in movies like La Raza Nunca Pierde - Huele a Gas and Guyana: Cult of the Damned and was the director and writer for The Secret Garden, a 1984 movie. He was the winner of the 1988 Goya Award for Best Cinematography for the film Remando al viento (Rowing with the Wind).

Awards and nominations

Filmography

References

External links 
 

1946 births
2019 deaths
Goya Award winners
Spanish cinematographers